The Fiji National Rugby League runs the national domestic rugby league competition in Fiji. Known as the Vodafone Cup, the competition features 32 teams across two conferences, each with two zones. The competition was formed in 1998, and has been Fiji's top level rugby league competition ever since.

The Sabeto Roosters are the current Premier Grade champions. The West Fiji Dolphins are reigning champions at Under 16 level.

Teams

Premiers

See also

Fiji women's national rugby league team
Fiji National Rugby League
Rugby league in Fiji
Fiji national rugby league team

References

Rugby league in Fiji
Oceanian rugby league competitions
Sports leagues established in 2010